The Rogers House is a historic house in Holden, Massachusetts.  The 1.5-story Cape-style wood-frame house was built sometime before 1733, and is possibly the oldest building in Holden (there is no firm evidence for a traditionally-ascribed date of 1722 for its construction).  It is the best-preserved example of its style in the area, which was once somewhat common.

The house was listed on the National Register of Historic Places in 1982, and was included in an expansion of the Holden Center Historic District in 1995.

See also
National Register of Historic Places listings in Worcester County, Massachusetts

References

Houses in Worcester County, Massachusetts
Holden, Massachusetts
Houses on the National Register of Historic Places in Worcester County, Massachusetts
Historic district contributing properties in Massachusetts